Andrey Rublev was the defending champion, but lost in the quarterfinals to Robin Haase. This was Rublev's first tournament back on tour after missing three months due to a stress fracture in his back.

Marco Cecchinato won the title, defeating Guido Pella in the final, 6–2, 7–6(7–4).

Seeds
The top four seeds receive a bye into the second round.

Draw

Finals

Top half

Bottom half

Qualifying

Seeds

Qualifiers

Lucky loser
  Andrej Martin

Qualifying draw

First qualifier

Second qualifier

Third qualifier

Fourth qualifier

References

 Main draw
 Qualifying draw

2018 ATP World Tour
2018 Singles
2018 in Croatian tennis